The 2013 NCAA Division I softball season, play of college softball in the United States organized by the National Collegiate Athletic Association (NCAA) at the Division I level, began in February 2013.  The season progressed through the regular season, many conference tournaments and championship series, and concluded with the 2013 NCAA Division I softball tournament and 2013 Women's College World Series.  The Women's College World Series, consisting of the eight remaining teams in the NCAA Tournament and held in Oklahoma City at ASA Hall of Fame Stadium, ended on June 6, 2013.

Conference standings

Women's College World Series
The 2010 NCAA Women's College World Series took place from May 30 to June 4, 2013 in Oklahoma City.

Season leaders
Batting
Batting average: .484 – Thomasina Garza, Texas Southern Tigers
RBIs: 84 – Lauren Chamberlain, Oklahoma Sooners
Home runs: 30 – Megan Baltzell, Longwood Lancers & Lauren Chamberlain, Oklahoma Sooners

Pitching
Wins: 40-12 – Olivia Galati, Hofstra Pride
ERA: 0.87 (17 ER/136.0 IP) – Michelle Gascoigne, Oklahoma Sooners
Strikeouts: 422 – Blaire Luna, Texas Longhorns

Records
Junior class single game home runs:
4 – Alexandria Anttila, Georgetown Hoyas; April 6, 2013

Sophomore class slugging percentage:
1.113% – Lauren Chamberlain, Oklahoma Sooners

Sophomore class runs:
87 – Lauren Chamberlain, Oklahoma Sooners

Awards
USA Softball Collegiate Player of the Year:
Keilani Ricketts, Oklahoma Sooners

Honda Sports Award Collegiate Woman Athlete of the Year:
Keilani Ricketts, Oklahoma Sooners

Honda Sports Award Softball:
Keilani Ricketts, Oklahoma Sooners

All America Teams
The following players were members of the All-American Teams.

First Team

Second Team

Third Team

References

External links